Clifton Hall School is an independent day school located near Newbridge in Edinburgh, Scotland. It is divided into the Nursery, Junior, and Senior Schools and educates pupils from nursery to Senior 6, ages 3-18.

Buildings
The school occupies a 19th-century, category A-listed building. This was constructed in 1850 to designs by David Bryce for the Maitland family, who had inherited the property in 1786. An older house, possibly from the late 16th century, forms the basis of the structure, although it was completely rebuilt in the Scottish baronial style.

Notable alumni

 Sir David Edward, lawyer and former judge of the Court of Justice of the European Communities
 Jim Clark, Formula One racing driver
 Archie Scott-Brown, racing driver
 Ewan Stewart, actor
 Graham Crowden, actor
 Rory Bremner, playwright and comedian
 James Aikman Cochrane, historical author

See also
 W. D. M. Bell, big game hunter, born at Clifton Hall

References

External links 
 Clifton Hall School website
 Clifton Hall School's page on Scottish Schools Online

Primary schools in Edinburgh
Secondary schools in Edinburgh
Private schools in Edinburgh
Educational institutions established in 1930
Category A listed buildings in Edinburgh
1930 establishments in Scotland